Croatia Association of Theatre Critics and Theatre Scholars (HDKKT) is a professional, nonprofit organization.

History 
The association was founded on 22 October 1975 at founding assembly in Zagreb and registered into Civil Association Register on 9 March 1976.

HDKKT is a member of International Association of Theatre Critics (AICT/IACT) and collaborates with The International Federation for Theatre Research (FITR/IFTR). It was founded with goal to develop and promote quality of the profession, cooperation with other similar associations and theatres in Croatia and abroad and to protect moral and material interests of its members. The associations structure comprises: Assembly, Executive Committee and President, Supervisory Committee and Court of Honour. Association first resides in Ilica 42 and later in Amruševa Street 19, Zagreb. It has about 50 active members and 15 retired and since 2013 dance critics are also admitted.

Association is funded by Ministry of Culture. Shortly after foundation, HDKKT launched Theatrology Library (Teatrologijska biblioteka) with Nikola Batušić as editor in chief and from 1979 till 1992 thirty-three titles were published. In year 1994 Theatrology Library merged with Library Prolog (Biblioteka Prolog), former CKD, which was inherited by AGM (Zagreb). The new library was named Actor′s Booklet Prolog (Glumišna knjižnica Prolog) with editorial board: Nikola Batušić, Branko Hećimović and Igor Mrduljaš. From 1992 till 1997 library published eleven books in cooperation with AGM after which AGM completely took over the publishing  activities.

In 80′s association introduced the Award for the Best Play of the Season through members′ survey.

Demeter's Award 

Since 2012 HDKKT awards Demeter's Award for Lifetime Achievement. First one was awarded to one of the founders of HDKKT, president, historian and theatrologist  Branko Hećimović 2012, second to secretary general, president, critic and theatrologist Igor Mrduljaš 2013 and the third to theatrologist, critic, educator and President of HDKKT Boris Senker. The Demeter Award is awarded on the day of publication of the first  Demeter′s critique of the first professional play in Croatian, Juran i Sofija by Ivan Kukuljević Sakcinski, in the journal Danica ilirska on 13 July 1840, which is considered the beginning of the Croatian theatre criticism.

List of Awardees
 2012 Branko Hećimović
 2013 Igor Mrduljaš
 2014 Boris Senker
 2015 Boris B. Hrovat
 2016. Vlatko Perković
 2017. Antonija Bogner Šaban

Managing Authority

Executive committee 
Sanja Nikčević - President, Alen Biskupović Secretary General, Mira Muhoberac, Antonija Bogner Šaban, Martina Petranović

Supervisory Committee 
Andrija Tunjić, Goran Ivanišević, Anđela Vidović

Court of Honour 
Boris Senker, Olga Vujović, Tomislav Kurelec

Former Presidents and Secretary Generals

Presidents 
Petar Selem (1976-1980), Branko Hećimović (1980-1982), Marija Grgičević (1982-1984),  Boris Senker  (1984-1988),  Nedjeljko Fabrio (1988-1991),  Mani Gotovac (1991-1993),  Antonija Bogner Šaban (1993-2001),  Boris B. Hrovat (2001-2005),  Igor Mrduljaš (2005-2010) and  Sanja Nikčević  (2010 - ).

Secretary Generals 
Giga Gračan (1976-1978), Igor Mrduljaš, Branko Vukšić (1991-1993), Ana Lederer (1993-2001), Sanja Nikčević (2001-2010), Ljubica Anđelković (2010-2012), Lidija Zozoli (2012 till 13 June 2014), Alen Biskupović (since 13 June 2014 - )

Theatre Research Library - list of editions 
 1.    Slavko Batušić , Zagreb, 1979. ed. Nikola Batušić,  for publisher Petar Selem
 2.    Frano Čale , Zagreb, 1979. ed. Nikola Batušić, for publisher Petar Selem
 3.    Petar Selem , Zagreb, 1979. ed.  Nikola Batušić, for publisher Igor Mrduljaš (tajnik)     
 4.    Branko Hećimović , Zagreb, 1979. ed. Nikola Batušić, for publisher Petar Selem
 5.    Marko Fotez , Zagreb, 1981. ed. Nikola Batušuć, for publisher Branko Hećimović 
 6.    Georgij Paro , Zagreb, 1981. ed. Nikola Batušić, for publisher Branko Hećimović   
 7.    Petar Selem , Zagreb, 1983., ed.  Nikola Batušić, for publisher Marija Grgičević 
 8.    Frano Čale , Zagreb, 1984. ed. Nikola Batušić,  for publisher  Marija Grgičević
 9.    Igor Mrduljaš , Zagreb, 1984. ed. Nikola Batušić,  for publisher Marija Grgičević  
 10.    Nikola Batušić , Zagreb, 1984. ed. Boris Senker, for publisher Marija Grgičević   
 11.    Tihomil Maštrović , Zagreb, 1985. ed. Nikola Batušić, for publisher Boris Senker   
 12.    Boris Senker , Zagreb, 1985. ed. Nikola Batušić, for publisher Igor Mrduljaš    
 13.    Ivo Hergešić , Zagreb, 1985. ed. Nikola Batušić, for publisher Boris Senker   
 14.    Milutin Cihlar Nehajev , Zagreb, 1986. ed. Nikola Batušić, for publisher Boris Senker   
 15.    Marko Marulić , Zagreb, 1986. ed. Nikola Batušić, for publisher Boris Senker   
 16.    Mani Gotovac , Zagreb, 1986. ed. Nikola Batušić, for publisher   Boris Senker
 17.    Dalibor Foretić , Zagreb, 1986. ed. Nikola Batušić, for publisher Boris Senker   
 18.    Ljudevit Galic , Zagreb, 1987. ed. Nikola Batušić, for publisher Boris Senker   
 19.    Nedjeljko Fabrio , Zagreb, 1987. ed. Nikola Batušić for publisher Boris Senker   
 20.    Čedo Prica , Zagreb, 1987. ed. Nikola Batušić, for publisher Boris Senker   
 21.    Boris Senker , Zagreb, 1987. ed. Nikola Batušić, for publisher Nedjeljko Fabrio    
 22.    Marijan Matković , Zagreb, 1988. ed. Nikola Batušić, for publisher Boris Senker   
 23.    Eliza Gerner , Zagreb, 1988.  ed. Nikola Batušić, for publisher Boris Senker
 24.    Antonija Bogner Šaban , Zagreb, 1988. ed. Nikola Batušić, for publisher  Boris Senker 
 25.    Igor Mrduljaš , Zagreb, 1988. ed. Nikola Batušić, for publisher Nedjeljko Fabrio    
 26.    Božidar Violić , Zagreb, 1989. ed. Nikola Batušić, for publisher Nedjeljko Fabrio   
 27.    Mladen Englesfield , Zagreb, 1989. ed. Nikola Batušić, for publisher Nedjeljko Fabrio   
 28.    Lada Čaće-Feldman , Zagreb, 1989. ed. Nikola Batušić, for publisher Nedjeljko Fabrio   
 29.    Tomislav Durbešić , Zagreb, 1989. ed. Nikola Batušić, for publisher    Nedjeljko Fabrio   
 30.    Georgij Paro Made in USA, Zagreb, 1990. ed. Nikola Batušić   
 31.    Nikola Vončina , Zagreb, 1990. ed. Nikola Batušić, for publisher Nedjeljko Fabrio    
 32.    Boris Senker , Zagreb, 1990. ed. Nikola Batušić, for publisher Nedjeljko Fabrio   
 33.    Ivan Lozica , Zagreb, 1990. ed. Nikola Batušić, for publisher  Nedjeljko Fabrio

Glumišna knjižnica Prolog (in cooperation with AGM, Zagreb, only titles including  HDKKT as co-publisher): 
 1.    Antonija Bogner Šaban , Zagreb, 1994.
 2.    Tahir Mujičić, Boris Senker , Zagreb, 1994.
 3.    Tomislav Bakarić , Zagreb, 1994. 
 4.    Igor Mrduljaš Ad hoc cabaret, Zagreb, 1995. 
 5.    Nikola Vončina , Zagreb,  1995.
 6.    Ivan Kušan , Zagreb, 1995.
 7.    Branko Hećimović , AGM, Zagreb, 1995.   
 8.    Antonija Bogner Šaban , Zagreb, 1997.
 9.    Igor Mrduljaš , Zagreb, 1997. ed. Bože Ćović    
 10.   Cecily Berry , Zagreb, 1997.  
 11.   Tomislav Bakarić , Zagreb, 1997.

References

External links 
 Official web page
 Associations Register Republic of Croatia 

Theatre in Croatia
Cultural organizations based in Croatia
Arts organizations established in 1975
1975 establishments in Croatia